Charlie Fairhead, played by Derek Thompson, is a fictional character from the BBC British medical drama Casualty. He is the longest-serving character, having been apart of the cast for over 36 years, and the only remaining original character to have appeared continuously since the first episode's broadcast on 6 September 1986. Derek Thompson chose to take a nine-month break from the show in early 2004. Charlie left the show in series 18 on 17 July 2004 and after five months, returned on 1 January 2005 in series 19. At the end of series 19, Charlie left again as Derek Thompson returned to his break from the show, with Charlie's exit scenes airing on 20 August 2005. After four months off-screen, Charlie returned in the series 20 Christmas crossover with Holby City, which aired on 24 December 2005. Derek Thompson has remained with the show since, but regularly takes breaks of around two months every year.

Derek Thompson has so-far made four appearances in Casualty sister show Holby City: the show's first episode in January 1999; the second episode to the Christmas crossover in December 2005; another crossover to Holby City in February 2010 when Charlie has a heart attack; and the most recent appearance in October 2012 when he interviewed Chantelle Lane (Lauren Drummond) for a full-time nursing position. Thompson also made an appearance in Casualty spin-off police drama, HolbyBlue for its first episode in May 2007.

Storylines
In the early days of Casualty, Charlie was depicted as a leader figure with a good sense of humour but a short temper, which occasionally got him caught in strife when dealing with people higher than himself.

During his time in Casualty, the character has come close to death on several occasions.

In Series 5, Charlie was shot in the chest with a handgun by a schizophrenic man, holding Megan Roach hostage in CRASH. He is seen to recover by Series 6.

In Series 12, Episode 24, Charlie and Baz Hayes were held hostage by an armed man who stormed the solicitor's office where Baz was finalising plans to leave Charlie and Holby, with custody of Louis. In a derelict building, Baz and Charlie have to repair a stab wound in the man's stomach. As he is about to shoot Baz, Charlie pushes him from Baz, just in time for a police sniper to kill the man. Upon their return to Casualty, Charlie proposes, and Baz accepts, to the delight of the rest of the staff. Next episode, it is the day of Baz and Charlie's wedding, however the ceremony is postponed when the staff are called back to Casualty to deal with a fire at another Casualty department. As Charlie walks outside to find a walkabout patient, he sees the man run down by a stolen ambulance. Charlie races out to help the patient, but he himself is run down by the ambulance while pulling the patient from the road. After much concern from the rest of the staff, it is discovered that Charlie has only broken his wrist and the wedding ceremony goes ahead.

In the final episode of Series 14, Charlie finds himself fed up, after many weeks of trying to help an alcoholic mother called Leona. After an argument, Charlie storms off to the Men's, with Leona in close pursuit. He pushes himself up against the door to prevent Leona from coming in. All of a sudden, Charlie clutches at his chest and collapses, at which point the episode ends. At the start of Series 15, it is discovered that Charlie has suffered a pulmonary embolism and slowly comes back to health.

In Series 19, Charlie and paramedic Luke are asked by nurse Claire Guildford to scatter the ashes of her accidentally murdered brother, Peter at the seaside. After discovering that Luke had tried to protect the killer, his former wife, receptionist Bex Reynolds, and that Charlie knew of this as well, Claire plunges her car into the harbour, taking Luke and Charlie with her. She dies, but Charlie and Luke make a full recovery.

In Series 24, Charlie is stressed after he relentlessly attempts to help Louis' pregnant girlfriend Shona from harming herself and the baby as Louis can't be bothered. He eventually finds Shona extremely drunk and high, slumped in a graveyard. As they are driving back to the Emergency Department, Shona plays ACDC far too loudly through Charlie's car radio. Charlie begins to cough up blood and crashes into a gutter. Shona races off to find help. Charlie is brought back to the Emergency Department with Shona, where it is found he has had a heart attack. He is operated on by Elliot Hope, one of his oldest friends, and he makes a slow but full recovery.

At the beginning of Series 30, after Zoe Hanna and Max Walker's explosive wedding reception, Charlie races into the freezing water to rescue Zoe, who is being drowned by her wedding dress. After arriving back at the Emergency Department, Charlie refuses treatment as he feels he does not need it despite being immersed in the freezing water for several minutes. Whilst trying to get on the phone to Louis, Charlie collapses. At first, he insists that he just pulled a muscle in his back whilst swimming, but the ECG results say that he has had a massive heart attack and he quickly loses consciousness and falls into Cardiac Arrest. After over half an hour of CPR and defibrillation, the team feel it is time to stop when Charlie's heart comes back to a normal rhythm. He is slowly recovering. He eventually returns to work.

In March 2020, Charlie quit his job at the emergency department, following a stressful several weeks after the death of Duffy.

He rejoined the Emergency Department in May 2020, after being held as a hostage by a mentally ill man.

Relationships
He has dated numerous women during the show. The most notable is Barbara Hayes - another original character - who was eventually his wife. Baz left Casualty after series one but returned nearly a decade later. Unhappily married, she reconciles with Charlie and falls pregnant with their son, Louis. Baz divorces her husband and marries Charlie in 1998 but they separate when Baz gets a job in Canada two years later. She briefly returns in late 2003 to visit her father but dies after a road accident so Charlie gets full custody of Louis. Charlie has come close to death on several occasions since 1990 as a result of a shooting and later a hit and run involving a stolen ambulance, a pulmonary embolism, attempted drowning and a heart attack. Charlie's son, Louis, sets him up with Maggie Coldwell (Susan Cookson). They date for a while and he proposes but she refuses, agreeing inside to stay in touch. In series 22, Charlie celebrates thirty-five years in nursing. However, he struggles with childcare issues and the news that he or Tess Bateman (Suzanne Packer) will be made redundant. Although Tess volunteers, Charlie is asked to leave after a fight with a patient.

He returns several months later, working in the private sector, and becomes a grandfather after Louis's brief relationship with Shona Wark results in a daughter. Shona, unable to cope, leaves her with Charlie, and he named her Megan after his long-term friend and former colleague, Megan Roach (Brenda Fricker), whom he and Tess recently helped commit suicide. While searching for his missing granddaughter, who had been taken by a mentally ill patient, Charlie sees Ruth Winters (Georgia Taylor)'s husband kissing his lover, James. Charlie debates whether to tell Ruth and confesses when comforting her. Hurt and humiliated by his deception, Ruth has Charlie transferred, but he moves back when Ruth is admitted to a psychiatric hospital. Ruth later returns to the ED and makes amends with Charlie. When Zoe Hanna (Sunetra Sarker) begins looking for a new consultant, following her promotion to clinical lead, and Charlie recommends a former nurse of Holby, Martin "Ash" Ashford (Patrick Robinson), and he later wins the job and begins working in the ED. He also begins mentoring new student nurse, Ally Hunter (Rebecca Newman), but after realising that she doesn't want to be a nurse and that she doesn't need to follow her mother and grandmother's footsteps she leaves the ED and decides to travel the world. Charlie later visits Louis in New Zealand.

Charlie returns from New Zealand, in August 2014, and clinical lead, Connie Beauchamp (Amanda Mealing) raises her concerns that Charlie doesn't seem interested in his job anymore, but little does she know of the nurse's health problems. Charlie arranges an appointment with Elliot Hope (Paul Bradley) where he believes Charlie has a high possibility of angina. Charlie later becomes irritable towards Tess when she recommends a retirement care plan. When Connie, Tess, Ash, Ethan and Lily are involved in a minibus crash, Charlie takes charge of the ED and ensures that Connie does not attempt a risky procedure on Ethan due to her own injuries. When Connie goes to him later in his office, he launches a tirade about how he loves his job too much and refuses to retire. Connie concedes and states that the team will need him, when she discovers that paramedic Jeff was killed when the minibus exploded. In February 2015, Charlie gives Connie a few harsh words after she makes the rash decision to ask Caleb Knight (Richard Winsor) for his letter of resignation.

Later, Charlie discovers that Louis is in Romania, has accumulated a large amount of debt and is addicted to heroin. Accompanied by Connie, he rescues his son on the verge of illegally donating a kidney for money and whisks him back to England. He tries to support his son in his recovery, but Louis relapses several times; Charlie shows Louis a dead drug addict and even threatens to take heroin himself to highlight the danger of Louis' addiction. A case of deep vein thrombosis and a potentially contaminated needle finally seems to shock Louis into recovery. On the verge of independence, Louis attends the wedding of Zoe Hanna and Max Walker, but gets drunk and starts a brawl with the groom, causing an accident that sends the wedding marquee up in flames.

Charlie is seen diving into the water to save Zoe; however, the exertion and hypothermia brought on a massive heart attack. Attempts to restart Charlie's heart were shown in real time, in parallel with other plot threads, with the episode ending with Charlie completely flatlining, and some of his colleagues contemplating giving up and declare him dead. After a lengthy resuscitation attempt by Connie, Rita and Lofty, he eventually regained consciousness and recovered by the end of the episode.

Development
He is described by the BBC as "the lynchpin of Holby's Emergency Department. [...] an indispensable, trustworthy and a diplomatic member of the team." Series producer Oliver Kent has described Charlie as "by far our most important character" and "absolutely core to the show's success". In 2012, Inside Soap described Charlie and Tess as 'the mum and dad of Casualty'. Current producer Nikki Wilson talked about the importance of Charlie and Tess saying, "I think it's really crucial that we keep them around. Charlie has been in the show for nearly 30 years, and he's such an iconic character. It's fantastic he's still here. His relationship with Tess is quite important - as you say, they're like the parents of the whole department - so long may it continue." In 2014, series producer, Erika Hossington spoke to Digital Spy about the show's plans for Charlie, saying, "We've got a small story that will show in the first third of series 29. However, we've also got bigger plans for him, which will begin in the final third of series 29 and continue towards the thirtieth anniversary." She continued to say how Charlie will be "centre of the thirtieth anniversary" and "in order for that to be impactful, they have to really build up to that". "Charlie's older fans will have complete satisfaction. I think Charlie is the heart of the show and should always be central, hence why he is going there."

Reception 
In August 2017, Thompson was long-listed for "Best Drama Star" at the Inside Soap Awards, while Charlie's wedding to Duffy was long-listed for "Best Drama Storyline." Both nominations made the viewer-voted shortlist, but Thompson did not win any awards. Charlie and Duffy's partnership was nominated for "Best Soap Couple" at the 2018 Digital Spy Reader Awards. They came in tenth place with 3.8% of the total votes.

References

External links

Casualty (TV series) characters
Male characters in television
Television characters introduced in 1986
Fictional nurses
Crossover characters in television